In mathematics, the Gorenstein–Walter theorem, proved by , states that if a finite group G has a dihedral Sylow 2-subgroup, and O(G) is the maximal normal subgroup of odd order, then G/O(G) is isomorphic to a 2-group, or the alternating group A7, or a subgroup of PΓL2(q) containing PSL2(q) for q an odd prime power. Note that A5 ≈ PSL2(4) ≈ PSL2(5) and A6 ≈ PSL2(9).

References

Theorems about finite groups